Personality Squares is an Australian game show series aired on Network Ten in 1967 until 1969 and revived in 1981. It was hosted by John Bailey, followed by Joe Martin then Bob Moore and ran until 1969, with announcer John Blackman. The revival in 1981 was hosted by Jimmy Hannan. The format was based on the American game show Hollywood Squares.

The show was briefly known as "Celebrity Squares" when it debuted in 1967. The title was also used for the version on the Nine Network hosted by Jimmy Hannan from 1975 to 1976. Regular panellists included Chelsea Brown, Ugly Dave Gray, Bert Newton, Patti Newton, Bob Rogers, Barbie Rodgers, Malcolm T. Elliott and Beryl Cheers.

"All-Star Squares" was another version of the show in 1999 hosted by Ian 'Danno' Rogerson with announcer Gavin Wood.

See also
 Celebrity Squares

References

Network 10 original programming
1960s Australian game shows
1970s Australian game shows
1980s Australian game shows
Black-and-white Australian television shows
1967 Australian television series debuts
1969 Australian television series endings
1981 Australian television series debuts
1981 Australian television series endings
English-language television shows